Keyler Lázaro García Estrada (born 14 January 1990) is a Cuban international footballer.

Club career
Nicknamed el Chino, Garcia played for hometown team Camagüey before leaving Cuba.

International career
He made his international debut for Cuba in an international friendly against Costa Rica in December 2011 and has earned a total of 5 caps, scoring no goals.

García was called up to the 2015 CONCACAF Gold Cup but defected to the United States in Chicago, one day prior to the Cuba's opening game against Mexico on 9 July 2015 at Soldier Field. Arael Argüelles, Darío Suárez and Ariel Martinez also fled their country at the same tournament.

His final international was a June 2015 FIFA World Cup qualification match against Curacao.

References

External links
 

1990 births
Living people
Sportspeople from Camagüey
Defecting Cuban footballers
Association football forwards
Cuban footballers
Cuba international footballers
FC Camagüey players
2015 CONCACAF Gold Cup players
21st-century Cuban people